Mahyadi Panggabean (born 8 January 1982) is an Indonesian footballer. He normally plays as a left wing back, but he can also be a real midfielder and his height is 175 cm. He plays for the Indonesia national football team and he was injured in their first game in group D in the AFC Asian Cup 2007 for Indonesia against Bahrain. In this game, he was substitutioned for other midfielder Eka Ramdani. His first appearance for the senior national team came in 2004 in a World Cup Qualifying match for Indonesia against Turkmenistan. Now he Assistant Coach for Sriwijaya F.C. 

His father's name is Mahadun Panggabean and her mother's name is Dewana Silitonga. Mahyadi likes travelling and listening to all kinds of music.

Honours

Club honors
PSMS Medan
Bang Yos Gold Cup (3): 2004, 2005, 2006

Sriwijaya
Indonesia Super League (1): 2011–12
Indonesian Community Shield (1): 2010
Indonesian Inter Island Cup (2): 2010, 2012

Participation in national team 
2003 SEA Games Vietnam (U-23)
2004 Pre World Cup Qualifying vs Turkmenistan
2004 Tiger Cup
2005 SEA Games Filipina (U-23)
2007 AFF Cup and Asian Cup

International career

International goals

External links

Indonesian footballers
1982 births
Living people
PSMS Medan players
Persik Kediri players
Sriwijaya F.C. players
Gresik United players
Liga 1 (Indonesia) players
2007 AFC Asian Cup players
People of Batak descent
Indonesia international footballers
Association football fullbacks
Association football wingers
Sportspeople from North Sumatra
21st-century Indonesian people